Ellinoceras is a genus of small, straight, annulate actinoceratid from the Middle Ordovician of northeastern Siberia with strongly sinuous sutures and subcentral siphuncle. Sutures have 14 narrow lobes and saddles, the ventral lobe deep and broad with a small median saddle. The siphuncle segments are short and broad with short necks and a wide endosiphuncular tube.

Ellinoceras somewhat only superficially resembles other members of the Actinoceratidae and is distinct mainly by its sinuous sutures.

References

Curt Teichert 1964 Acinoceratoidea. Treatise on Invertebrate Paleontology Part K Mollusca 3. Geological Society of America and University of Kansas Press.

Prehistoric nautiloid genera